.pm is the country code top-level domain (ccTLD) for Saint Pierre and Miquelon. It is managed by AFNIC, with registration services opening on 6 December 2011.

As of June 2021, there are more than 7000 registered .pm domains.

British Domain Holders Post-Brexit 
Since 1 January 2021, British citizens have not been able to register .pm domains. However, as AFNIC is unable to apply policies retroactively, it is allowing all registrations pre-Brexit to continue, with renewal permitted.

Notable usage 

 The Office of The Prime Minister of Australia owns the domain aus.pm as a short URL

See also 
 Internet in Saint Pierre and Miquelon
 Internet in France
 ISO 3166-2:PM
 .fr –ccTLD for the Republic of France
 .eu –ccTLD for the European Union

External links 
 IANA .pm whois information
 .pm information website

References

Country code top-level domains
Communications in Saint Pierre and Miquelon

sv:Toppdomän#P